Friend Public Schools is a school district headquartered in Friend, Nebraska.

It operates Friend Elementary School and Friend Junior-Senior High School.

In 2017 a Twitter account criticizing officials and using the logo of the district had appeared. The district board asked for the owner to contact them. When this did not happen, the district filed a lawsuit to find the identity of the owner in 2019.

References

External links
 Friend Public Schools
 

Education in Saline County, Nebraska
School districts in Nebraska